Flying Jake is a children's picture book by Lane Smith. It was originally published in 1988 by Macmillan Publishing Company and reprinted by Viking Press in 1996. In this wordless story, a boy named Jake takes flight in pursuit of his pet bird, which has flown out of its cage and through a window. Flying Jake was the first independent work by Smith, who later illustrated The True Story of the 3 Little Pigs! and The Stinky Cheese Man and Other Fairly Stupid Tales.

Reception
The book received mixed reviews. In The New York Times, Signe Wilkinson called it "a rich picture poem that gives readers of any age a certain feeling about flight among the birds." Several teachers' guides have also recommended the book for use in grade school classrooms. However, Carol McMichael of School Library Journal criticized Flying Jake for its "busy, confused story and bizarre illustrations."

Notes

1988 children's books
American picture books
Children's fiction books
Wordless books
Macmillan Publishers books
Books about birds
Viking Press books